The following lists events that happened during 1995 in Cape Verde.

Incumbents
President: António Mascarenhas Monteiro
Prime Minister: Carlos Veiga

Events
February 16: Correios de Cabo Verde established after the dissolution of Empresa Pública dos Correios e Telecomunicaçöes
April 5 - May 26: Eruption of the volcano Pico do Fogo,

Arts and entertainment
First edition of annual theatre festival Mindelact 
July 18: Cesária Évora's album Cesária released

Sports
Boavista Praia won the Cape Verdean Football Championship

Births
January 1: Rony Cruz, footballer
January 15: Félix Mathaus, footballer
January 27: Thierry Graça, footballer
January 13: Carlos Ponck, footballer
May 11: Gelson Martins, footballer
December 16: Flávio dos Santos Dias, footballer

References

 
Years of the 20th century in Cape Verde
1990s in Cape Verde
Cape Verde
Cape Verde